Þórólfsfell is a basaltic tuya in southern Iceland, east of Fljótshlíð. The upper section is made up of pillow lavas and is 574 metres above sea level.

See also
Volcanism of Iceland
List of volcanoes in Iceland

References
Thorolfsfell

Tuyas of Iceland
East Volcanic Zone of Iceland
Volcanoes of Iceland
Mountains of Iceland